Easy Street: The True Story of a Mob Family (1981) is the first memoir of Susan Berman, daughter of Las Vegas mobster David Berman. In it, Berman chronicles her mother Gladys's and her own obliviousness to what went on around them. When they finally became aware of their Mafia family, Berman's mother ended up dying in a mental institution and Susan endured a lot of psychotherapy.

Easy Street received critical acclaim and was optioned for a movie, but the film was never made.

Berman wrote a second non-fiction book, part memoir and part history, titled Lady Las Vegas: The Inside Story Behind America's Neon Oasis.

Berman was murdered at her home by her close friend Robert Durst, and her body discovered on Christmas Eve day 2000.

Further reading
Murder of a Mafia Daughter by crime writer Cathy Scott (Barricade Books, 2002)

References

External links 
 Easy Street on Amazon
 NYMag Article: Who Killed the Gangster's Daughter?
 Reuters report on Berman's death

1981 non-fiction books
American memoirs
Non-fiction books about organized crime
Organized crime memoirs
Dial Press books